Cama may refer to:
Cama, a Parsi name
Cama (animal), a cross between a camel and a llama
Cama, Switzerland, a municipality in the Graubünden
Cama Hospital in Mumbai, India
Cama (surname)

CAMA is an abbreviation for:
California-Arizona Maneuver Area, formerly known as the Desert Training Center, or DTC
Centralized Automatic Message Accounting
Christian and Missionary Alliance, an Evangelical Protestant denomination
Community Arts Music Association, Santa Barbara, California
Computer-Assisted Mass Appraisal, software used to establish real estate appraisals for property tax calculations

See also
Camael
Kama (disambiguation)
Karma (disambiguation)
Khama (disambiguation)